William Andrew Robinson (September 29, 1928 – March 31, 2016) was a halfback in the National Football League. He was drafted in the twenty-fifth round of the 1952 NFL Draft by the Pittsburgh Steelers and played that season with the Green Bay Packers. Later he was a member of the New York Titans during the 1960 American Football League season. He died in 2016.

References

Green Bay Packers players
New York Titans (AFL) players
American football halfbacks
Lincoln Blue Tigers football players
1929 births
2016 deaths
Players of American football from Pittsburgh